Sir Roger de Northwode (c. 1230 – 9 November 1286) held the posts of Warden of the Cinque Ports and Baron of the Exchequer.

He was a son of Sir Stephen de Northwode, Knight and his wife, Joan. Both parents were born before 1178. He may have been born earlier than 1230, possibly circa 1215. He married twice: first to Bona (probably de Waltham) and second to Juliana.

Some confusion exists over when he received his knighthood, as it is cited that in September 1265, when he served as steward of the Archbishop of Canterbury, he was also "a knight commissioned in Kent to take the lands of the rebels into the king's hands".

It has also been stated that (again) in September, but of 1275, he received his knighthood. Therefore, he was knighted sometime between September 1265–75; this much is certain, and he was thereafter commissioned on numerous public services. Specifically he was appointed Constable of Dover Castle and held this office until about the turn of 1259. He was also Lord Warden of the Cinque Ports after 1255 but before 1258 when he was replaced by Nicholas de Moels.

de Northwode 'took an interest in the old monastery of St. Sexburge for it had been long neglected. He made many repairs and donated to the monastery, "wherefore among the servants of God, he is to this day called the restorer of that house."'

References

General references
 

1230 births
1286 deaths
13th-century English Navy personnel
Lords Warden of the Cinque Ports